Bacolod Chicken Inasal is a Philippine restaurant chain primarily serving inasal, a kind of roast chicken served on skewers that originated in the Visayas. It is also a sponsor for a number of television sitcoms on ABS-CBN.

History

The chain was established in 1993 by the Tanalgo siblings; Rose, Bing and JM. It began as a small take-out stall in Mandaluyong where customers purchased their food then ate them at their convenience. A year later, a full-fledged store was built to allow patrons to sit and dine. Soon, their specialties gained attention among the denizens of Metro Manila and, five years after it was founded, a second outlet was built in Makati.

Advertising

The mascot of the chain is a caricature boy named Toto. His name is a Visayan customary way in which young boys and some men are called. On ads or banners, the character talks in Ilonggo or Hiligaynon (subtitled in Tagalog).

Portraits of local actress Judy Ann Santos, holding an inasal, are often seen on ads that promote the restaurant chain. She was selected to be an endorser of the business because they were inspired by a dish called Ysabella Chicken that appeared in a TV drama called Ysabella which stars Santos. Despite this, Rose Tanalgo said the recipe for their chicken is rather different from what was seen in the TV series.

See also
 List of fast-food chicken restaurants

References

External links

Fast-food poultry restaurants
Fast-food chains of the Philippines
Restaurants established in 1993
Companies based in Makati